Matthew Godfrey may refer to:

Matt Godfrey (born 1981), American boxer
Matt Godfrey (angler) (born 1991), English angler
Matthew Godfrey (actor) (born 1971), Canadian actor